Eternal Records was a British imprint of Warner Bros. Records. Originally formed in the early 1980s as an imprint for various genres such as post-punk and new wave, it was later relaunched in the mid-1990s as an electronic/Eurodance imprint. The label went dormant in the early 2000s.

See also
 List of record labels

British record labels
New wave record labels
Electronic music record labels
Post-punk record labels